The Agatha Christie series is a series of adventure games developed by AWE Games and published by The Adventure Company and DreamCatcher Interactive, based on the works of the English mystery writer Agatha Christie.

Profile
The first three games were developed by American developer AWE Productions and published between 2005 and 2007 by The Adventure Company, a division of DreamCatcher Interactive. In 2006 Dreamcatcher Interactive and its intellectual property was bought by Austrian publishing company JoWooD Entertainment. Since the acquisition, DreamCatcher has continued to launch titles both under The Adventure Company and DreamCatcher labels including the fourth game in the Agatha Christie series (which was co-developed by AWE Productions and Black Lantern Studios for the Nintendo DS handheld console and was published by Dreamcatcher).

Four hidden object games were developed by Floodlight Games and publised by Oberon Games between 2006 and 2010.

In 2011, both DreamCatcher Interactive, and its parent company, JoWood Entertainment went into administration and their assets were absorbed into Nordic Games (which was later re-branded as THQ Nordic). The company did not acquire the rights to Agatha Christie games in the process.

In August 2013 the French video game publisher and distributor Anuman Interactive announced that its adventure label Microïds had purchased the rights to use Agatha Christie novels. The game, titled Agatha Christie: The ABC Murders was developed by Lyon-based Artefacts Studio and published in February 2016.

In September 2021 Anuman Interactive released a prequel, titled Agatha Christie: Hercule Poirot - The First Cases, developed by Blazing Griffin.

The following games in the series have been released:

References

External links

Adventure games
Point-and-click adventure games

Detective video games
Video game franchises introduced in 2005